The 348th Infantry Division was an infantry division of the German Army during the Second World War, active from 1942 to 1944.

Operational history

The 348th Infantry Division was formed on 14 September 1942 in France from personnel of Wehrkreis XII.

After its training, it served as a occupation, security and defense unit of the coastal areas in the North of France, in the Dieppe and Calais sector within the LXXXI. Armeekorps of the 15th Army in Army Group D.

In August 1944, she was sent to Normandy, where she suffered heavy losses during her withdrawal to northern France and Belgium.

The division was disbanded on 29 September 1944.

Commanders
Generalleutnant Karl Gümbel (27 September 1942 – 5 February 1944 );
Generalleutnant Paul Seyffardt (5 February - 29 September 1944);

Sources
Lexikon der Wehrmacht

Military units and formations established in 1942
Military units and formations disestablished in 1944
0*348